3rd Uruguayan Film Critics Association Awards
The 3rd Uruguayan Film Critics Association Awards were held in 2003.

Winners
Best Film: Mystic River
Best Latin American Film: Historias mínimas (Minimal Stories), Argentina/Spain)
Best Uruguayan Film: El viaje hacia el mar (A Trip to the Seaside/Seawards Journey)

References
IMDb - Uruguayan Film Critics Association 2003

 

Uruguayan Film Critics Association Awards
2003 film awards